Valter-Gerhard Kadarik (also Valter-Gerhard Freimann; 25 July 1898 Juuru Parish (now Rapla Parish), Kreis Harrien – 11 July 1975 Juuru Selsoviet, Rapla Parish) was an Estonian politician. He was a member of the Chamber of Deputies (Riigivolikogu) of VI Riigikogu.

References

1898 births
1975 deaths
People from Rapla Parish
People from Kreis Harrien
Estonian Lutherans
Patriotic League (Estonia) politicians
Members of the Estonian National Assembly
Members of the Riigivolikogu
Estonian veterinarians
University of Tartu alumni
Estonian military personnel of the Estonian War of Independence
Recipients of the Order of the White Star, 5th Class